The Oxon Hill–Suitland Line, designated Routes D12 & D14, are daily bus routes operated by the Washington Metropolitan Area Transit Authority between Southern Avenue station and Suitland station of the Green Line of the Washington Metro. The D12 operates every 20 minutes between 7AM and 9PM and 60 minutes after 9PM while the D14 operates every 24-30 minutes during the peak hours and every 60 minutes all other times. Trips roughly take 60 minutes (D12) or 70-80 minutes (D14).

Background
Routes D12 and D14 operate between Southern Avenue station and Suitland station mainly connecting riders along Saint Barnabas Road for the D12, and Brinkley Road, Allentown Road, and Indian Head Highway for route D14. Routes D12 and D14 operate daily. Route D14 follows much of the D12 routing except skipping the D12 routing along Audrey Lane, Irvington Street, Glassmanor Drive, Kennebec Street, Deal Drive, Marcy Avenue and Livingston Terrace.

Routes D12 and D14 currently operate out of Andrews Federal Center garage full-time with select peak-hour trips operating out of Shepherd Parkway garage. The line formally operated out of Southern Avenue garage on weekdays and Shepherd Parkway on weekends.

D12 Stops

D14 Stops

History
Routes D12 and D14 was originally operated under the Washington Marlboro & Annapolis Motor Lines Inc. (WM&A) which operated between Eastover Shopping Center and Downtown Washington DC beginning in 1945 (D14) and 1948 (D12). The line was connected via South Capitol Street towards Downtown (11th and E Streets NW). Route D12 originally was named Route D while route D14 was originally named Route M.  In 1953 WM&A adopted letter designations for its routes with new routes D12 and D14. In 1973, routes D12 and D14 were acquired by WMATA when they acquired the WM&A.

Later, route D14 would be eliminated, but a new route S12 would be introduced to operate alongside the D12. Route S12 would operate between Southview apartments and Federal Center station while route D12 operate between Marlow Heights and Federal Center station. At the time, the line was run as the Eastover–Marlow Heights Line.

On November 21, 1978, both routes D12 and S12 were shorten to operate between Eastover Shopping Center and Federal Center station. S12 service between Southview Apartments and Eastover was replaced by route P12.

On January 3, 2000, new boarding and alighting restrictions were implemented on route D12. During the AM rush, passengers can get on and off any southbound D12 bus going to Marlow Heights at any bus stop in Maryland and the District of Columbia with restrictions for northbound buses not changing. Passengers can get on and off the bus in Maryland but only get off the bus at stops in the District of Columbia.

During the PM rush, passengers can get on and off northbound buses going to Federal Center SW at any bus stop in Maryland and the District of Columbia with southbound restrictions not changing. Passengers can only get on the bus in the District of Columbia, and get on or off the bus at any stop in Maryland.

On January 13, 2001 when the Green Line extension to Branch Avenue station opened, route D12 was rerouted to operate between Suitland station and Southern Avenue station mainly operating along Saint Barnabas Road, Oxon Hill Road, Indian Head Highway, and Southern Avenue. Buses were also rerouted via 28th Avenue and Keith Street (behind Marlow Heights Shopping Center) and extended from the shopping center to the Suitland station via Branch Avenue and Saint Barnabas and Silver Hill roads.

Routes W11 and W12 from the Eastover–Indian Head Highway Line were also rerouted to operate alongside the D12 between Southern Avenue and Suitland stations and were renamed into routes D13 (W11) and D14 (W12). The line would mainly operate along Suitland Road, Allentown Road, Brinkley Road, Livingston Road, Indian Head Highway, and Southern Avenue. The line also operated via Andrews Air Force Base, as well as the Camp Springs, Temple Hills, and Glassmanor neighborhoods, which former Routes  W11, W12, and W17 originally operated on between the Federal Center SW station and Acokeek.

All route S12 service was eliminated in the process being replaced by route D12, and P12.

In 2010 during WMATA's FY2011 budget, WMATA proposed to divert routes D13 and D14 into Oxon Hill Park & Ride Lot off Oxon Hill Road just west of Indian Head Highway in order to create a transfer connection between those routes and the NH1, which serves National Harbor. This would provide closer connections to National Harbor for passengers instead of having to take the Green Line to Branch Avenue station.

Beginning on October 15, 2019 for two years, eastbound D13 and D14 buses were forced to detour due to the Maryland State Highway Administration’s Maryland Route 210 Interchange Project. This prevents buses from turning left from Indian Head Hwy - MD 210 onto Livingston Road. As a result, routes D13 and D14 were forced to backtrack along Indian Head Highway detouring on Wilson Bridge Drive, before resuming its regular route Lindsay Rd at Livingston Rd. A temporary time transfer was also implemented for affected passengers at closed bus stops westbound. Westbound buses were unaffected by the detour.

During the COVID-19 pandemic, route D13 was suspended and routes D12 and D14 was reduced to operate on its Saturday supplemental schedule during the weekdays beginning on March 16, 2020. On March 18, 2020, the line was further reduced to operate on its Sunday schedule. On March 21, 2020, weekend service on the D14 became suspended and Route D12 was reduced to operate every 30 minutes. Service was restored to its full service on August 23, 2020.

In February 2021 during the FY2022 budget, WMATA proposed to eliminate Routes D13 and D14, and propose to extend the D12 to National Harbor to replace the NH1 and eliminate service between Southern Avenue station and Livingston Road & Oxon Hill Road if it did not receive federal funding. However the changes were avoided on March 10, 2021.

Beginning on June 15, 2021 eastbound routes D13 and D14 resumed its regular routing on Livingston Road following the completion of the Maryland State Highway Administration's Maryland Route 210 Interchange Project.

On September 5, 2021, all Route D13 service was renamed to the D14 while D14 service along Livingston Road, Livingston Terrace, Marcy Avenue, Deal Drive, Kennebec Street, Glassmanor Drive, Irvington Street, and Audrey Lane in Glassmanor was eliminated. Service was replaced by Routes D12 and P12 which increased service to every 12 (P12) and 20 (D12) minutes. Between Wilson Bridge Drive and the intersection of Indian Head Highway & Oxon Hill Road, service will operate along Kirby Hill Road and Oxon Hill Road, adding service at Oxon Hill Park & Ride. Service will continue to Wilson Bridge Drive.

References

D12